Route 905 is a  long north to south secondary highway in the southern portion of New Brunswick, Canada.

Route description
The route is in Westmorland County and Albert County.

The route's northern terminus is in Petitcodiac at the intersection of Route 1 and Route 106. It travels southeast through a mostly treed area then turns south following the Pollett River passing through Pollett River.  The route continues south ending in Elgin at Route 895.

History

See also

References

905
905